"Yankee White" is the first episode in the first season of the American crime drama television series NCIS. It first aired on CBS in the United States on September 23, 2003. The episode is written by Donald P. Bellisario & Don McGill and directed by Bellisario. It was seen by 13.04 million viewers.

While on Air Force One, a Navy Commander tasked with carrying the "football" dies under mysterious circumstances, forcing an emergency landing in Wichita, Kansas but while his death is originally thought be to a tragic accident, NCIS eventually uncovers evidence suggesting the commander was murdered and that it might be connected to a possible assassination attempt on the President of the United States.

The episode introduces Caitlin "Kate" Todd (as a replacement for NCIS agent Vivian "Viv" Blackadder), and FBI Agent Tobias Fornell, who would later become a major recurring character of the show. The rest of the team were all introduced in a double episode of JAG season 8, "Ice Queen" and "Meltdown".

The episode title (Yankee White) is the administrative nickname for a background check conducted on Department of Defense personnel working with the president and vice president.

Robert Balkovich says the episode is "a historic moment in the NCIS universe....full of enjoyable character moments and satisfying twists and turns.”

Plot 
While on Air Force One, U.S. Navy Commander Ray Trapp dies of an apparent stroke after having lunch with the President despite the efforts of the President's doctor and medical team. The plane is forced to land at Wichita, Kansas and the President is flown to his original destination on a back-up plane. Trapp visited Air Force One only because Marine Major Timothy Kerry was sick with the flu. NCIS arrive to investigate the death, but meet some jurisdictional problems with both the FBI and Secret Service who each want to take the lead. With Secret Service agent Caitlin Todd grudgingly agreeing to help, NCIS Special Agents Leroy Jethro Gibbs and Tony DiNozzo, and NCIS Medical Examiner Donald "Ducky" Mallard examine the body. The local coroner, a friend of Ducky's, manages to stall the FBI long enough for NCIS to hijack the entire crime scene: Tony shuts the door with the FBI agents still outside and, after receiving authorization from Agent Todd, the pilot immediately flies the plane back to Washington.

During the trip, NCIS begin preliminary examinations before Agent Todd becomes ill. Gibbs is worried she too is infected with whatever killed the Commander, but she explains it is the same flu that Major Kerry had, revealing that she is in a relationship with him which is against fraternization rules. Following the plane to Washington, Senior FBI agent T. C. Fornell makes a deal with Agent Todd's superior Secret Service Agent William Bear to take control of the investigation and cut out NCIS by ordering Agent Todd to deliver Commander Trapp's body upon landing, as whoever has the body controls the investigation. Despite her protests, Agent Todd follows orders but Gibbs, having suspected such an eventuality, arranged for DiNozzo to impersonate the body allowing their escape. NCIS Director Thomas Morrow later makes a deal with his counterparts for a three-way investigation with NCIS in the lead (as they possess the body).

Back at the NCIS headquarters, Ducky is autopsying the body of Commander Trapp, only to find he suffered a cerebral embolism, which is considered a natural cause of death. Gibbs wants the team to keep looking while he joins Agent Todd aboard Air Force One. On board, Gibbs begins to irritate Agent Todd by comparing the plane to the 1997 film Air Force One, whilst discovering that she met Major Timothy Kerry for a drink during her brief stay in DC. Later, another senior officer revealed to be Marine Major Timothy Kerry, is found dead in his car in Georgetown with similar symptoms to those of Commander Trapp. NCIS Forensic Specialist Abby Sciuto is able to find DMSO and snake venom from an Australian Taipan on both Commander Trapp and Major Kerry's uniforms, which could explain why they died. DiNozzo investigates both of them, finding out that Trapp and Kerry used the same dry cleaner and informs Gibbs.

Aboard Air Force One, after determining that the current "football" carrier isn't in danger, Gibbs begins an interrogation of Agent Todd as she was the last person with both dead men. Gibbs questions her motive for Commander Trapp's death before revealing Major Kerry was dead as well, and Todd's reaction makes Gibbs believe that she is innocent. NCIS determines that it is a complex terrorist attempt to assassinate the President, and Gibbs realises that goal of Commander Trapp's death was to switch to the backup plane. Todd explains the differences between the backup plane and the main plane, and Gibbs focuses on the armory, which has locks instead of digital keypads. If terrorists are planning an attack, they must have copied the keys.

Aware of the threat, Gibbs checks the armory while Todd protects the President. The armory is open, and a journalist is trying to get to the President's quarters in an attempt to kill him. Gibbs confronts the journalist, who attacks, but is killed before any damage is done. At the end of the episode, Agent Bear thanks Gibbs for his hard work, and reveals Todd resigned from the Secret Service for breaking fraternization rules. She is then recruited by Gibbs as an NCIS agent.

Production 

The episode is written by Donald P. Bellisario & Don McGill and directed by Donald P. Bellisario.  According to the DVD commentary, the episode was written as an homage to the 1997 film Air Force One. According to Bellisario, the NCIS pilot episode was easy to sell to CBS because of its low costs compared to the JAG pilot. Together with Billy Webb (Director of Photography), Bellisario wanted to give NCIS a different look than other shows, starting with the first episode of the series. First find out "how would we normally shoot this, now let's figure another way to shoot it". Short clips in between scenes became a trademark. "We moved fast, we jump cut in the middle of scenes, and we jump cut dialogues". "What we ended up with was a completely different shooting style".

In the first pilot episodes (back-door pilot), as a part of JAG, Robyn Lively is seen in the role as NCIS agent Vivian Blackadder. Bellisario stated that "she was a little soft for this kind of role", and is replaced by a new and different character in this episode.  Portrayed by Sasha Alexander, Secret Service agent Caitlin Todd is recruited by Gibbs at the end of the episode, filling Blackadder's place at Gibbs' team.

Together with Alexander's character, two recurring characters were introduced. FBI agent Tobias C. Fornell (portrayed by Joe Spano), who still is a part of the series, and medical assistant Gerald Jackson (Pancho Demmings). Jackson departed from the series later in season 1 before returning for one final time in the Season 3 opening episodes, "Kill Ari (Part I)" and "Kill Ari (Part II)".

Gibbs' rules 
The first three of Gibbs' rules are revealed:
 No. 1 "Never let suspects stay together."
 No. 2 "Always wear gloves at a crime scene."
 No. 3 "Don't believe what you're told. Double-check."

According to executive producer Shane Brennan, the first three rules is a double set. "When [Gibbs] joined NCIS, Mike Franks told him he didn't need dozens of different rules to be an agent... just three 'golden rules'. This is why we have double ups [...]. Three of them are Gibbs' rules; three of them are Mike Franks' rules". Whether it is Gibbs or Frank's rules shown in the episode, Brennan does not tell.

Pop culture references 
Throughout the episode, Gibbs makes various often-humorous references to Harrison Ford and his role in the 1997 film Air Force One. This aspect of Gibbs's portrayal in the episode has become significant to long-time fans of the show given the creative decision to make the character more stoic and "pop-culture-illiterate"  in later episodes, as well as the association of extensive film knowledge and quoting with the character of DiNozzo.

Reception 
"Yankee White" was seen by 13.04 million live viewers following its broadcast on September 23, 2003, with an 8.6/14 share among all households.  A share means the percentage of television sets in use tuned to the program.

References

External links 
 

2003 American television episodes
NCIS (season 1) episodes